Chuvanna Sandhyakal is a 1975 Indian Malayalam film, directed by K. S. Sethumadhavan and produced by M. O. Joseph. The film stars Adoor Bhasi, Lakshmi, Mohan Sharma and Sam in the lead roles. The film has musical score by G. Devarajan.

Cast
 
Adoor Bhasi 
Lakshmi 
Mohan Sharma 
Sam(A.T.Samuel)
Sankaradi 
Bahadoor 
M. G. Soman 
Manibala
Meena 
Paravoor Bharathan 
Sujatha 
Vidhubala

Soundtrack
The music was composed by G. Devarajan and the lyrics were written by Vayalar.

References

External links
 

1975 films
1970s Malayalam-language films
Films directed by K. S. Sethumadhavan